are items of Japanese clothing that cover the stomach. They are worn for health and fashion reasons.

Wartime use 
A mother, sister, or wife would stand on the street and ask passing women to contribute a stitch until 1,000 had been collected. The garment was meant to both provide warmth and serve as a talisman to ward away harm.

Popular fashion 
Modern  do not have much in common with their historical predecessors that were made for armour. They are a simple circular tube of fabric, much like a tube top, worn around the midriff as opposed to the chest.
	 
The new  have gained popularity in Japanese fashion as an accessory and are made from many fabrics and patterns for practical and aesthetic purposes. Shigesato Itoi and his company Hobonichi are commonly credited for the current resurgence. Itoi had been wearing  for years despite their old-fashioned reputation and perception as an unfashionable undergarment, eventually re-introducing them as an accessory for sale in Japan.

See also
 
 Other bellybands

References

External links 
 

Japanese sashes
Japanese words and phrases